Frederick Herbert Pearce (4 September 1916 – 8 May 1964) was an Australian rules footballer who played with Collingwood in the Victorian Football League (VFL).

Family
The son of Edmund John Pearce (1878–1946), and Lillian Pearce (1882–1947), née Andrews, Frederick Herbert Pearce was born at Collingwood, Victoria on 4 September 1916.

He married Joyce Lorraine Miller (1917–?) in 1940.

Military service
Pearce served in the Australian Army during World War II, and saw active service in New Guinea where his battalion was involved in the fight against the Japanese at Isurava on the Kokoda Tack in 1942. He suffered from both dengue fever and malaria while serving.

Death
He died at Abbotsford, Victoria on 8 May 1964.

Notes

References
 
 B883, VX119405: World War Two Service Record: Private Frederick Herbert Pearce (VX119405), National Archives of Australia.

External links 

 
 
 Fred Pearce at The VFA Project
 Fred Pearce's profile at Collingwood Forever

1916 births
1964 deaths
Australian rules footballers from Victoria (Australia)
Prahran Football Club players
Collingwood Football Club players
Australian Army personnel of World War II
Australian Army soldiers